The Lord Chamberlain of the Household is the most senior officer of the Royal Household of the United Kingdom, supervising the departments which support and provide advice to the Sovereign of the United Kingdom while also acting as the main channel of communication between the Sovereign and the House of Lords. The office organises all ceremonial activity such as garden parties, state visits, royal weddings, and the State Opening of Parliament. They also handle the Royal Mews and Royal Travel, as well as the ceremony around the awarding of honours.

For over 230 years, the Lord Chamberlain had the power to decide which plays would be granted a licence for performance. From 1737 to 1968, this meant that the Lord Chamberlain had the capacity to censor theatre at his pleasure.

The Lord Chamberlain is always sworn of the Privy Council, is usually a peer and before 1782 the post was of Cabinet rank. The position was a political one until 1924. The office dates from the Middle Ages when the King's Chamberlain often acted as the King's spokesman in Council and Parliament.

The current Lord Chamberlain is the Lord Parker of Minsmere, who has been in office since 1 April 2021.

Historic role
During the early modern period, the Lord Chamberlain was one of the three principal officers of the Royal Household, the others being the Lord Steward and the Master of the Horse. The Lord Chamberlain was responsible for the "chamber" or the household "above stairs": that is, the series of rooms used by the Sovereign to receive increasingly select visitors, terminating in the royal bedchamber (although the bedchamber itself came to operate semi-autonomously under the Groom of the Stool/Stole). His department not only furnished the servants and other personnel (such as physicians and bodyguards, the Yeomen of the Guard and Gentlemen Pensioners) in intimate attendance on the Sovereign but arranged and staffed ceremonies and entertainments for the court. He had (secular) authority over the Chapel Royal, and through the reabsorption of the Wardrobe into the Chamber, was also responsible for the Office of Works, the Jewel House, and other functions more removed from the Sovereign's person, many of which were reorganized and removed from the Chamberlain's purview in 1782.

As other responsibilities of government were devolved to ministers, the ordering of the Royal Household was largely left to the personal taste of the Sovereign. To ensure that the chamber reflected the royal tastes, the Lord Chamberlain received commands directly from the sovereign to be transmitted to the heads of subordinate departments.

In 1594, the Lord Chamberlain, Henry Carey, 1st Baron Hunsdon, founded the Lord Chamberlain's Men, for which William Shakespeare was a part (and later a shareholder in the company) and for whom he wrote most of his plays during his career. Carey served under Elizabeth I of England at the time and was in charge of all court entertainment, a duty traditionally given to the Master of the Revels, a deputy of the Lord Chamberlain. Later, in 1603, James I of England, elevated the Chamberlain's Men to royal patronage and changed the name to the King's Men.

Theatre censorship

The Licensing Act 1737 
In 1737, Sir Robert Walpole officially introduced statutory censorship with the Licensing Act of 1737 by appointing the Lord Chamberlain to act as the theatrical censor. The Licensing Act 1737 gave the Lord Chamberlain the statutory authority to veto the performance of any new plays: he could prevent any new play, or any modification to an existing play, from being performed for any reason, and theatre owners could be prosecuted for staging a play (or part of a play) that had not received prior approval.

Historically though, the Lord Chamberlain had been exercising a commanding authority on London's theatre companies under the Royal Prerogative for many decades already. But by the 1730s the theatre was not controlled by royal patronage anymore. Instead it had become more of a commercial business. Therefore, the fact the Lord Chamberlain still retained censorship authority for the next 200 years gave him uniquely repressive authority during a period where Britain was experiencing "growing political enfranchisement and liberalization".

Even further confusion rested in the fact that Members of Parliament could not present changes to the censorship laws because although the Lord Chamberlain exercised his authority under statute law, he was still an official whose authority was derived from the Royal Prerogative.

Theatres Act 1843 
By the 1830s, it started to become clear that the theatre licensing system in England needed an upgrade. Playwrights, instead of representatives of minor theatres, actually initiated the final push for reform as they felt that their livelihoods were being negatively affected by the monopoly the larger theatres had on the industry, backed by the laws in the 1737 Act.

A Select Committee was formed in 1832 with the purpose of examining the laws that affected dramatic literature. Their main complaints were the lack of copyright protection for their work and more importantly that only two patent theatres in London could legitimately perform new plays. After more pressure from playwrights and theatre managers, the findings of the committee were finally presented to Parliament.

It was the proposals of this committee that Parliament implemented in the Theatres Act of 1843. The Act still confirmed the absolute powers of censorship enjoyed by the Lord Chamberlain but still slightly restricted his powers so that he could only prohibit the performance of plays where he was of the opinion that "it is fitting for the preservation of good manners, decorum or of the public peace so to do". The Act, however, did abolish the monopoly that the patent houses had in London, providing a minor win for playwrights and theatre managers wishing to produce new work.

Theatres Act 1968 
In 1909, a Joint Select Committee on Stage Plays (Censorship) was established and recommended that the Lord Chamberlain should continue to act as censor but that it could be lawful to perform plays without a licence from the Lord Chamberlain. However, King Edward VII refused to accept these recommendations. The outbreak of both World Wars put an end to any parliamentary initiatives to change the laws regarding theatre censorship for many years. In 1948, the first British Theatre Conference recommended the termination of theatre censorship with the plan to pursue parliamentary action to ratify this.

In the 1960s the debate to abolish theatre censorship rose again as a new generation of young playwrights came on the scene. They gained popularity with their new plays in local establishments, but since many were refused a licence by the Lord Chamberlain, they could not transfer to the West End. In the case of John Osborne's play A Patriot for Me, the Lord Chamberlain at the time, Lord Cobbold, was irritated that the play was so widely publicized even though he had banned it and therefore pursued legal action. In the end, the play was allowed to continue as it was. At this point, several widely regarded authors had all been censored by the Lord Chamberlain at one time or another, including playwrights Henrik Ibsen and George Bernard Shaw. Another Joint Select Committee was founded to further debate on the issue and present a solution. This time the argument largely centered around this issue on the portrayal of living and recently dead individuals, particularly in reference to the monarchy as well as politicians.

After much debate, the Theatres Act 1968 was finally passed; it officially abolished the censorship of the stage and repealed the Lord Chamberlain's power to refuse a licence to a play of any kind. The first London performance of the musical Hair was actually delayed until the Act was passed after a licence had been refused.

Aftermath 
The battle regarding the abolition of censorship was largely a political one, fought on principle. Those who opposed the termination of this particular duty of the Lord Chamberlain were mostly concerned about how to protect the reputation of the royal family and the government instead of controlling obscenity and blasphemy on stage. However, this concern has largely been unfounded. Since the termination of censorship, British drama has flourished and produced several prominent playwrights and new works since. The abolishment of censorship opened a floodgate of theatrical creativity.

Duties of the office
The Lord Chamberlain is the most senior official of the Royal Household and oversees its business, including liaising with the other senior officers of the Household, chairing Heads of Department meetings, and advising in the appointment of senior Household officials. The Lord Chamberlain also undertakes ceremonial duties and serves as the channel of communication between the Sovereign and the House of Lords. 

The Lord Chamberlain's Office is a department of the Royal Household and its day-to-day work is headed by the Comptroller. It is responsible for organizing ceremonial activities including state visits, investitures, garden parties, the State Opening of Parliament, weddings and funerals.

On State and ceremonial occasions, the Lord Chamberlain carries specific symbols that represent his office: a white staff and a key (which is worn at the hip pocket). These insignia are returned to the monarch when the Lord Chamberlain retires from office; but if the monarch dies, the white staff is symbolically broken by the Lord Chamberlain and placed on the coffin of the deceased Sovereign at the end of the State Funeral service. This was last done by the Lord Parker of Minsmere, who broke his staff over the coffin of Queen Elizabeth II in 2022.

The Lord Chamberlain is ex-officio the Chancellor of the Royal Victorian Order, having possession of a Badge corresponding to that office. As such, they are often appointed to the said Order either upon appointment as Lord Chamberlain, or later in their career. The Lord Chamberlain also regulates the design and the wearing of court uniform and dress and how insignia are worn.

List of Lords Chamberlain of the Household from 1399

See also
List of Lord Chamberlains
List of Lords Chamberlain to British royal consorts
Lord Chamberlain's Office
Central Chancery of the Orders of Knighthood

References

Further reading

External links

The Lord Chamberlain – Royal Household official website
Chamber Administration: Lord Chamberlain, 1660–1837
The Lord Chamberlain and censorship at The Theatre Archive Project

British monarchy
Theatre in the United Kingdom
Positions within the British Royal Household
Ceremonial officers in the United Kingdom